Forcier is a surname. Notable people with the surname include:

André Forcier (born 1947), Canadian film director and screenwriter
Chad Forcier, American basketball coach
Tate Forcier (born 1990), American football player
Teresa Forcier (born 1953), American politician